Sirpur Assembly constituency is a constituency of Telangana Legislative Assembly, India. It is one of two constituencies in Komaram Bheem district. It comes under Adilabad (Lok Sabha constituency) along with 6 other Assembly constituencies.

Koneru Konappa of Telangana Rashtra Samithi is currently representing the constituency for the third time.

Mandals
The Assembly Constituency presently comprises the following Mandals:

Election Data

Election results

Telangana Legislative Assembly election, 2018

Telangana Legislative Assembly election, 2014

See also
 List of constituencies of Telangana Legislative Assembly

References

Assembly constituencies of Telangana
Komaram Bheem district